Charles London (born August 12, 1975) is an American football coach and former player who is the pass game coordinator and quarterbacks coach for the Tennessee Titans of the National Football League (NFL).

Early life
London attended Dunwoody High School in Dunwoody, Georgia, before enrolling at Duke University, where he played for the Duke Blue Devils football team.

Coaching career

Duke  
London returned to Duke as a graduate assistant in 2004. He spent two years as a graduate assistant before becoming the full-time running backs coach in 2006. The Blue Devils will end up losing all 12 games in 2006, recording the fourth winless season in program history.

First stint in the NFL 
The Chicago Bears hired London on March 1, 2007 as an offensive assistant/quality control coach. London was fired alongside his offensive coordinator Ron Turner on January 6, 2010. 

He joined the Philadelphia Eagles as a pro scout in 2010 and then joined the Tennessee Titans in 2011 as an offensive assistant and quality control coach.

Penn State 
London returned to college-level coaching as Penn State University’s running backs coach under head coach Bill O’Brien, who he had worked with prior in 2005–06 in Duke. The Nittany Lions went 8–4 in 2012, defeating No. 24 Northwestern but falling to No. 9 Ohio State & No. 18 Nebraska. Despite the winning record, they were not eligible for a bowl game. Under his coaching, running back Zach Zwinak eclipsed 1,000 yards from scrimmage and scored 7 touchdowns.

The Nittany Lions went 7-5 and won the Lambert-Meadowlands Trophy. They would defeat No. 18 Michigan & No. 14 Wisconsin but lose to No. 4 Ohio State. Under his coaching, Zwinak racked up 989 yards and scored 12 touchdowns.

Houston Texans 
London left Penn State to join O’Brien's coaching staff when he became the head coach of the Houston Texans during the 2014 NFL season. The Texans would go 9-7 and miss the playoffs. Under his coaching, running back Arian Foster recorded over 1,500 yards from scrimmage & scored 13 touchdowns and was named to the Pro Bowl. 

The Texans would go 9-7 and win the AFC South division title in 2015, the first playoff berth since 2012, but were shut out by the Kansas City Chiefs 30–0 in the Wild Card Round. During the season they defeated the would-be AFC North champion Cincinnati Bengals 10–6 in a Week 10 matchup.

The Texans would go 9-7 and repeat as AFC South champions, defeating the Oakland Raiders in the Wild Card Round but then falling to the New England Patriots in their first divisional round matchup since 2012. Under his coaching, Lamar Miller would record over 1,200 yards from scrimmage and score 6 touchdowns. Under his coaching, Lamar Miller repeated his 2016 season, racking up 1,200 yards from scrimmage and 6 touchdowns. He resigned from his position on January 2, 2018, wanting to seek a quarterback coaching position.

Chicago Bears 
London rejoined the Chicago Bears as running backs coach on January 10, 2018. Under his coaching, Jordan Howard eclipsed 1,000 yards from scrimmage and scored 9 touchdowns.

The Bears' offense produced the fifth fewest rushing yards in the NFL in 2019.

Atlanta Falcons 
London was hired by the Atlanta Falcons as their quarterbacks coach on January 22, 2021.

Tennessee Titans 
London was hired by the Tennessee Titans as their pass game coordinator and quarterbacks coach on February 9, 2023.

References

External links
 Tennessee Titans bio

1975 births
Living people
Chicago Bears coaches
Duke Blue Devils football players
Penn State Nittany Lions football coaches
Tennessee Titans coaches
Duke Blue Devils football coaches
Houston Texans coaches
American football running backs
Atlanta Falcons coaches